These are the results of the women's team all-around competition, one of six events for female competitors in artistic gymnastics at the 1996 Summer Olympics in Atlanta. The compulsory and optional rounds took place on July 21 and 23 at the Georgia Dome. With their dramatic first ever gold medal, the United States gymnastics team was nicknamed the Magnificent Seven. The result also meant that the Russian team didn't win gold for the first time after ten consecutive Olympic victories. The format had changed slightly from the 1992 Summer Olympics in Barcelona where instead of 6 members, national teams were made up of 7 members. Following the rules of what was known as the "7–6–5" format, 6 athletes performed on each apparatus, but only the top 5 scores counted towards the final combined score at the end, dropping the lowest score.

Qualification
The top 12 teams at the 1995 World Artistic Gymnastics Championships earned places in the team all-around competition.

Results

*Qualified to all-around final, but did not participate.

References
Official Olympic Report
www.gymnasticsresults.com

Women's Team All-Around
1996 in women's gymnastics
Women's events at the 1996 Summer Olympics